Corinne at Cape Misenum is an oil on canvas painting by François Gérard, created in 1919-1821. It depicts the title character from Corinne, an 1808 novel by Madame de Stael, at Cape Miseno. The painting is held now in the Musée des Beaux-Arts de Lyon.

Sources
https://web.archive.org/web/20130718173715/http://www.mba-lyon.fr/mba/sections/fr/documentation-musee/dossier-pedagogique2/corinne-au-cap-misen

1821 paintings
Paintings by François Gérard
Paintings in the collection of the Museum of Fine Arts of Lyon